Banksia densa var. densa is a variety of Banksia densa. It was known as Dryandra conferta var. conferta until 2007, when Austin Mast and Kevin Thiele sunk all Dryandra into Banksia. Since the name Banksia conferta had already been used, Mast and Thiele had to choose a new specific epithet for D. conferta and hence for this variety of it. As with other members of Banksia ser. Dryandra, it is endemic to the South West Botanical Province of Western Australia. As an autonym, it is defined as encompassing the type material of the species.

References

Further reading
 
 
 
 

densa var. densa
Endemic flora of Western Australia
Eudicots of Western Australia